James Smith-Williams (born July 29, 1997) is an American football defensive end for the Washington Commanders of the National Football League (NFL). He played college football at NC State and was drafted by Washington in the seventh round of the 2020 NFL Draft.

College career
A 3-star recruit, Smith-Williams committed to NC State over offers from Appalachian State, Boston College, and James Madison, among others. Smith-Williams posted 36 tackles, nine of which were for a loss, and six sacks in 2018. He was limited to seven games in 2019 and had 20 tackles and a sack. In his career, he played in 29 games and had 82 tackles, 12 tackles for loss, eight sacks, and three pass deflections. He graduated with a degree in business supply chain management.

Professional career

Smith-Williams was selected by the Washington Football Team in the seventh round (229th overall) of the 2020 NFL Draft. He signed his four-year rookie contract on July 22, 2020.

In the Week 10 of the 2021 season, Smith-Williams had his first career start in place of an injured Montez Sweat.  The following week, he and defensive tackle Daron Payne sealed the win over the Carolina Panthers after they sacked quarterback Cam Newton on fourth down with less than a minute and a half left in the game. On December 11, 2021, he was placed on COVID-19 reserve list and was forced to sit out the Week 14 game against the Dallas Cowboys, but reactivated a week later.

Personal life
He served as an intern for IBM during college, specializing in robotic animation, and has a job offer with them following his football career.

References

External links

Washington Commanders bio
NC State Wolfpack bio

1997 births
Living people
Players of American football from Raleigh, North Carolina
American football defensive ends
NC State Wolfpack football players
Washington Commanders players
Washington Football Team players
American roboticists